The 2006 UTEP Miners football team represented the University of Texas at El Paso in the 2006 NCAA Division I FBS football season. The team's head coach was Mike Price. The Miners played their home games at the Sun Bowl Stadium in El Paso, Texas. UTEP averaged 42,444 fans per game, ranking 50th nationally.

Schedule

References

UTEP
UTEP Miners football seasons
UTEP Miners football